The Delphic League is a high school athletic league that is part of the CIF Southern Section.

Members
 Crossroads School
 Milken High School
 Marshall Fundamental Secondary School
 Vernon Kilpatrick Camp School, aka Kilpatrick High School
 Brentwood School (Los Angeles, California)

References 

CIF Southern Section leagues